The rulers of Tuscany varied over time, sometimes being margraves, the rulers of handfuls of border counties and sometimes the heads of the most important family of the region.

Margraves of Tuscany, 812–1197

House of Boniface
These were originally counts of Lucca who extended their power over the neighbouring counties.
Boniface I, 812–823 
Boniface II, 828–834
Aganus, 835–845
Adalbert I, 847–886
Adalbert II the Rich, 886–915
Guy, 915–929
Lambert, 929–931

House of Boso
These were the (mostly illegitimate) relatives of Hugh of Arles, King of Italy, whom he appointed to their post after removing the dynasty of Boniface
Boso, 931–936
Humbert, 936–961
Hugh the Great, 961–1001

House of Hucpold
Boniface (III), 1004–1011

Nondynastic
Rainier, 1014–1027

House of Canossa
These were the descendants of the Counts of Canossa.
Boniface III, 1027–1052
Frederick, 1052–1055
Matilda, 1055–1115
Beatrice of Bar, 1052–1069 (regent as mother of Frederick and Mathilda)
Godfrey the Bearded, Duke of Lower Lorraine, 1053–1069 (regent as husband of Beatrice and step-father to Frederick and Matilda)
Godfrey the Hunchback, Duke of Lower Lorraine, 1069–1076 (co-ruler as husband of Matilda)
Welf II, 1089–1095 (co-ruler as husband of Matilda)

Nondynastic
Rabodo, 1116–1119
Conrad, 1119/20–1129/31
Rampret, c. 1131
Engelbert, 1134/5–1137
Henry the Proud, 1137–1139
Ulrich of Attems, 1139–1152 (imperial vicar)
Welf VI, 1152–1160 
Welf VII, 1160–1167
Rainald of Dassel, Archbishop of Cologne, 1160–1163 (imperial vicar)
Christian of Buch, Archbishop of Mainz 1163–1173 (imperial vicar)
Welf VI, 1167–1173
Philip, 1195–1197
In 1197 Philip was elected King of Germany and the majority of the Tuscan nobility, cities and bishops formed the Tuscan League with Papal backing.
Frederick of Antioch, 1246–50 (imperial vicar)

After this, Tuscany was splintered between the competing republics of Florence, Pisa, Siena, Arezzo, Pistoia and Lucca. Since the 14th century, Florence gained dominance over Pistoia (1306, officially annexed 1530), Arezzo (1384), Pisa (1406), and Siena (1559). Lucca was an independent republic until the Napoleonic period in the 19th century.

Rulers of Florence, 1434–1569

De facto rulers of the House of Medici, 1434–1494

Republic of Florence (1494-1512)

Rulers of the House of Medici (1512-1532) 

After the Sack of Rome, Florence overthrew the Medicis once more and became a republic until Pope Clement VII signed a peace treaty with Charles V, Holy Roman Emperor who then invaded Florence and restored the Medicis.

Medici dukes of Florence, 1532–1569

Medici grand dukes of Tuscany, 1569–1737

Habsburg-Lorraine grand dukes of Tuscany, 1737–1801

Bourbon-Parma kings of Etruria, 1801–1807

Tuscany was annexed by France, 1807–1814.  Napoleon's sister Elisa Bonaparte was given the honorary title of Grand Duchess of Tuscany, but did not actually rule over the region.

Habsburg-Lorraine grand dukes of Tuscany, 1814–1860

Leopoldo II was driven from Tuscany by revolution from 21 February to 12 April 1849, and again on 27 April 1859.  He abdicated in favor of his son, Ferdinando IV, on 21 July 1859, but Ferdinando IV was never recognized in Tuscany, and was deposed by the provisional government on 16 August.  Tuscany was annexed by Piedmont-Sardinia on 22 March 1860.

Titular Habsburg-Lorraine claimants, 1860–present

See also
 List of Tuscan consorts
 Grand Duchy of Tuscany
 History of Tuscany

 
People from Tuscany

Lists of Italian people
Tuscany
History of Tuscany
Grand Duchy of Tuscany
House of Habsburg-Lorraine
House of Medici
People of the Republic of Florence
Royal houses of the Grand Duchy of Tuscany